Dieter Engelhardt (18 August 1938 – 30 November 2018) was a German football player who competed in the 1964 Summer Olympics.

References 

1938 births
2018 deaths
German footballers
Olympic footballers of the United Team of Germany
Olympic bronze medalists for the United Team of Germany
Olympic medalists in football
Footballers at the 1964 Summer Olympics
Medalists at the 1964 Summer Olympics
DDR-Oberliga players
German footballers needing infoboxes
Association football midfielders
East Germany international footballers
20th-century German people